They're Watching is a 2016 American found footage horror comedy film directed and written by Jay Lender and Micah Wright. The film stars Brigid Brannagh, David Alpay, Kris Lemche and Dimitri Diatchenko and was released in theaters and On Demand on March 25, 2016.

Plot
The crew of a popular home-improvement TV show heads to a remote village in Moldova to film a follow-up segment about an American homeowner, Becky, who's been transforming a rundown house into an artist's haven. The crew, consisting of Greg, Alex, and newcomer Sarah, meet up with their producer Kate and a Moldovian businessman named Vladimir. While getting some footage of the town, Greg and Sarah sneak into a funeral and attempt to record it, only to be exposed when Kate calls them. A police officer manages to calm the furious crowd before ordering them to leave.

The crew continue filming over the next few days, facing numerous interruptions and repeatedly finding themselves at the receiving end of hostility and suspicion from the locals, including an old woman who sneaks into Sarah's hotel room to chant a prayer at her. Greg and Alex later show Sarah a video of Greg and Vladimir walking into the barn to find Kate having sex with Becky's boyfriend Goran six months ago when the house was purchased. Despite telling Kate the camera was off at the time, they planned on showing it to their boss should Kate try to fire them. Vladimir tells the crew a story about how the village had once been struck by a plague, and they accused a woman who lived alone outside of town of being a witch before burning her at the stake. On the last planned day of filming, Becky shows the crew a mural on the wall of her cellar that depicts the story. They're interrupted by Alex's cries of pain from outside when a dog he was playing with suddenly becomes aggressive and bites him in the arm. They abandon filming to get Alex's wound at a local butcher's and resolve to finish the next day before their flight leaves.

That evening the crew go to a bar and attempt to make peace with the locals. Everything goes well until a drunk Sarah instigates a fight by shouting "witch" in the local language. The next day, they rush to finish filming at Becky's home so they can leave Moldova as soon as possible. However, they discover their car has been vandalized and rendered unusable, forcing them to spend the night with Becky and wait for Goran to arrive the next morning. Vladimir offers to walk to town and bring back a taxi. Kate blames Sarah for the vehicle's destruction due her actions the previous night, causing Sarah to reveal that the affair was recorded.

A few hours later, Becky and Sarah discover Vladimir's dead body crucified onto an outdoor furnace, and the crew barricade themselves inside the house. Later that night, Greg tells Sarah his story about his time in Afghanistan (something he was uncomfortable to talk about earlier in the film). While filming at an all-girl school, Taliban local police entered the school and executed a child while forcing Greg to film it. As Greg breaks down in tears, Sarah comforts him and the two then have sex. Later they wake up to find Kate gone. The remaining survivors hear a noise and go out to investigate, only to find Kate nailed to the roof of the barn with her intestines hanging out. Sarah spots Goran's car in the barn and realizes Becky has been lying about Goran being out. She and Alex later find out Becky knew of Goran's affair with Kate when they spotted her in the video, watching them through the window. They believe Becky killed them as an act of vengeance including Vladimir because he witnessed the encounter and realize Greg could be next because he recorded it. Before they could warn him, the villagers begin breaking into the house, forcing everyone to flee into the basement. There, Sarah uncovers a mural that depicts the production crew's entire stay in Moldova, including their deaths, as well as a demonic Becky surrounded by fire.

Becky reveals herself as a real witch (implied to be the same witch as in Vladimir's story) who brought the crew to Moldova to witness her vengeance on the villagers, and she drinks from a large vat of blood that has the decomposed body of her boyfriend floating in it. She disintegrates Greg, prompting Sarah and Alex to escape into the woods. They run into an angry mob of villagers, and Sarah is murdered by the police officer with an axe to the head. Becky appears and uses her powers to brutally and bloodily kill all of the villagers while a terrified Alex records everything. After everyone is dead, Becky orders Alex to share the footage of her rampage with the world before disappearing. The film ends as a blood-soaked and traumatized Alex wonders how he will explain everything to his boss.

Cast
Brigid Brannagh as Becky Westlake
David Alpay as Greg Abernathy 
Kris Lemche as Alex Torini
Carrie Genzel as Kate Banks 
Dimitri Diatchenko as Vladimir Filat 
Tatiana Dumitru as Pavlovka Villager
Mia Faith as Sarah Ellroy
Bogdan "Baros" Guta as Village Brute

References

External links

They're Watching at Internet Movie Database
They're Watching at Box Office Mojo
They're Watching at Rotten Tomatoes

2016 films
2016 comedy horror films
American comedy horror films
Found footage films
2010s English-language films
2010s American films